The 2017 Mountain West Conference women's basketball tournament was held on March 6–10, 2017 at the Thomas & Mack Center in Las Vegas, Nevada. The Boise State Broncos won their third Mountain West tournament title and earned an automatic bid to the 2017 NCAA tournament.

Seeds
Teams are seeded by conference record, with a ties broken by record between the tied teams followed by record against the regular-season champion, if necessary.

Schedule

Bracket

References

2016–17 Mountain West Conference women's basketball season
Mountain West Conference women's basketball tournament